Choapam District is located in the south of the Papaloapan Region of the State of Oaxaca, Mexico. It covers 3,166 km2, and as of 2005 had a population of 37,809.
Its southwestern portion is mountainous, while the northeast is in the coastal plain of the gulf of Mexico.

Municipalities

The district includes the following municipalities:

References

Districts of Oaxaca
Papaloapan Region